The Baton Rouge Southern Railroad, abbreviated BRS, was founded in November 2008. The main objective of the 1.5-mile railroad is to provide cars and transloading services to local businesses. It also serves as a switching and car storage facility for the Kansas City Southern. It holds an advantageous location close to the Port of Greater Baton Rouge, Port Allen, Louisiana. It is owned by Watco.

References

Companies based in Baton Rouge, Louisiana
Louisiana railroads
Railway companies established in 2008
Watco
2008 establishments in Louisiana